Tom Thumb House may refer to:

Tom Thumb House (Norfolk, Connecticut), on the National Register of Historic Places listings in Litchfield County, Connecticut
Tom Thumb House (Middleborough, Massachusetts), listed on the National Register of Historic Places in Plymouth County, Massachusetts